Callisina is a genus of leaf beetles in the subfamily Eumolpinae. It is distributed in Asia.

Species
 Callisina assamensis Jacoby, 1908
 Callisina balyi Jacoby, 1895
 Callisina brunnea Jacoby, 1908
 Callisina burmanica Jacoby, 1895
 Callisina fasicata Baly, 1860
 Callisina fasciata baliana Medvedev & Takizawa, 2011
 Callisina fasciata fasciata Baly, 1860
 Callisina fasciata javana Medvedev & Takizawa, 2011
 Callisina fulva Medvedev, 2004
 Callisina integricollis Jacoby, 1884
 Callisina prominula Jacoby, 1908
 Callisina quadripustulata Baly, 1864
 Callisina rufa Tan, 1992
 Callisina rufipes Pic, 1928
 Callisina trigibbosa Pic, 1928

Synonyms:
 Callisina indica Baly, 1881: synonym of Cleoporus quadripustulatus (Baly, 1859)

References

Eumolpinae
Chrysomelidae genera
Beetles of Asia
Taxa named by Joseph Sugar Baly